The women's 1500 metres speed skating event was part of the speed skating at the 1960 Winter Olympics programme. It was the first appearance of women's speed skating events at the Olympics and the 1500 metres were the second contest after the 500 metres. The competition was held on the Squaw Valley Olympic Skating Rink and for the first time at the Olympics on artificially frozen ice. It was held on Sunday, February 21, 1960. Twenty-three speed skaters from ten nations competed.

Medalists

Records
These were the standing world and Olympic records (in minutes) prior to the 1960 Winter Olympics.

(*) The record was set in a high altitude venue (more than 1000 metres above sea level) and on naturally frozen ice.

Klara Guseva set the first Olympic record with 2:28.7 minutes. Then Elwira Seroczyńska improved the Olympic record with 2:25.7 minutes. Finally Lidiya Skoblikova set a new world record with 2:25.2 minutes.

Results

As Robb and Kim skated in the same pair the referees decided that Robb finished ahead to place 20th.

References

External links
Official Olympic Report
 

Women's speed skating at the 1960 Winter Olympics
Skat
Olymp